Kathleen Butler may refer to:

 Kathleen Butler (screenwriter), British screenwriter
 Kathleen M. Butler (1891–1972), Australian project manager and "Godmother of Sydney Harbour Bridge"
 Kathleen Butler (linguist) (1883–1950), British linguist
 Kathleen Butler-Hopkins, American violinist